A temporary Lebanese government was formed on 19 April 2005, after 50 days of the resignation of Omar Karami government. The main goal of the cabinet was to supervise the 2005 Lebanese general election, so it was headed by Najib Mikati and 14 independent ministers. A total of 110 MPs gave it the confidence, 3 voted against and 11 were absent since the parliament contained only 126 members, following the assassination of Rafic Hariri and Bassel Fleihan.

Composition

References 

Cabinets of Lebanon
Cabinets established in 2005
2005 establishments in Lebanon